Dorothea L Dix may refer to:-

Dorothea Dix, a nineteenth-century American activist.
USS Dorothea L. Dix an American transport ship